Bergedorf, or Hamburg-Bergedorf, is a borough of the German city of Hamburg. 

Hamburg-Bergedorf may also refer to:
Bergedorf (quarter), a district within Bergedorf
Hamburg-Bergedorf – Harburg, an electoral district
Hamburg-Bergedorf station, a railway station
Hamburg-Bergedorf Railway Company, a railway company
Hamburg-Bergedorf Observatory, an astronomical observatory